FabricLive.43 is a 2008 album by Switch & Sinden. The album was released as part of the FabricLive Mix Series.

Track listing
  Juiceboxxx & Dre Skull - Center Stage - Vicious Pop Records
  Yo Majesty - Club Action - Domino
  Aquasky ft. Acafool - Have a Good Time (The Count & Sinden Remix) - Passenger
  Armand Van Helden - This aint Hollywood - Southern Fried
  Scottie B And King Tutt - African Chant - Unruly
  Mujava - Township Funk (Sinden Remix) - This Is Music
  Tigerstyle ft. Vybz Kartel, Mangi Mahal & Nikitta - Balle! Shava! (Sinden Remix) - Nachural
  MixHell - Highly Explicit (Brodinski Remix) - Boysnoize Records
  Buraka Som Sistema - Luanda Lisboa - Fabric Records
  Radioclit - Secousse (Instrumental Version) - Mental Groove
  2 Tracks Mixed:
  Alan Braxe ft. Killa Kella & Fallon - Nightwatcher (Show Me) (Instrumental) - Eye Industries
  Double S & True Tiger - From Day - True Tiger/Always
  Joker - Gully Brook Lane - TerrorRhythm
  JME - AWOH - Boy Better Know
  Skream - Fick - Tempa
  Zomby - Strange Fruit - Ramp
  Caper - Hybrid - Studio Rocker
  Project Bassline - Drop The Pressure (The Count & Sinden Remix) - Cheap Thrills
  Piddy Py - Giggle Riddim - Dress to Sweat
  Róisín Murphy - Overpowered (Herve & Róisín in the Secret Garden Mix) - EMI
  Machines Don't Care - Beat Bang - Machines Don't Care
  Kudu - Let's Finish (Sinden Remix) - Nublu
  M83 - Couleurs - Gooom Disques
  SALEM - Redlights - Acephale Records

External links
Fabric: FabricLive.43

Fabric (club) albums
2008 compilation albums